Cornelis Jan Bazen (born 3 January 1948) is a former speed skater from the Netherlands. He dominated the national sprint championships in the early 1970s, winning them in 1970–1972, finishing second in 1973–1974 and third in 1975–1976. He competed at the  1976 Winter Olympics in the 500 m and finished in 6th place.

Personal bests: 
500 m – 38.8 (1972)
 1000 m – 1:18.1 (1976)
 1500 m – 2:06.0 (1970)
 5000 m – 8:42.1 (1968)

References

External links
 

1948 births
Living people
Dutch male speed skaters
Olympic speed skaters of the Netherlands
People from Zuidplas
Speed skaters at the 1976 Winter Olympics
Sportspeople from South Holland